Lieutenant General Ranbir Singh, PVSM, AVSM & Bar, YSM, SM, ADC is a former General Officer in the Indian Army. He last served as the General Officer-Commanding-in-Chief (GOC-in-C) Northern Command. He assumed office on 1 June 2018 from Lt Gen Devraj Anbu who assumed the office of Vice Chief of the Army Staff. He was the Director General of Military Operations (DGMO) of the Indian Army during the 2016 Indian Line of Control strike & during the 2015 Indian counter-insurgency operation in Myanmar he was  Additional Director General of Military Operations (ADGMO). He was considered the face of the operations because he briefed the media after both the strikes.

Early life and education 
Singh is from Jalandhar and his family belongs to Ambala Jattan, Hoshiarpur district, Punjab. His father, who was a JCO in the Indian Army, died when he was young. His uncle, Colonel Manmohan Singh (retd), adopted him when he was three years old.

He is an alumnus of St. Joseph’s Convent School, Lajpat Nagar; Sainik School, Kapurthala; National Defence Academy, Pune and Indian Military Academy, Dehradun. He has also attended Defence Services Staff College, Wellington; Faculty of Studies at Army War College, Mhow and Royal College of Defence Studies, London.

Career 
Singh was commissioned into the 9th battalion, Dogra Regiment on 13 December 1980. He has held various important Command, Staff and Instructor appointments during his career. He is considered to be an expert at counter insurgency operations, operational art and information operations. He has also served in the military operations directorate as a Colonel and Brigadier. His commands include the 181 Mountain Brigade, 33 Armoured division and I Corps (Mathura). He has held various staff appointments including that of Additional Director General of Military Operations(ADGMO) when he was Major general, Director General of Military Operations (DGMO) and Deputy Chief of Army Staff (Information Systems and Training). He has also served in UN Peacekeeping Missions to Rwanda and as a Chief Operations Officer at Sudan.

During his career, he has been awarded the Yudh Seva Medal (2010) as the Brigadier of 181 Mountain Brigade, the Ati Vishisht Seva Medal twice (2015, 2018) for his service, and the Param Vishisht Seva Medal in 2020.

Honours and decorations

Dates of rank

Personal life 
Singh met his wife when he was posted in Mumbai and they have a son.

References 

Living people
Indian generals
Recipients of the Yudh Seva Medal
Recipients of the Ati Vishisht Seva Medal
Indian Army officers
National Defence Academy (India) alumni
Recipients of the Sena Medal
Year of birth missing (living people)
Recipients of the Param Vishisht Seva Medal
Army War College, Mhow alumni
Defence Services Staff College alumni